is a village located in Ōshima Subprefecture, Tokyo Metropolis, Japan. , the village  had an estimated population of 1,841, and a population density of 99 persons per km².

Geography
Warmed by the Kuroshio Current, the town has a warmer and wetter climate than central Tokyo.

Neighboring municipalities
Tokyo Metropolis
Niijima, Tokyo
Mikurajima, Tokyo

Climate

History
Kōzushima Village was founded on October 1, 1923, when the Izu islands were administratively divided into villages and town.

Economy
The village economy is dominated by commercial fishing and seasonal tourism. There is also some small-scale farming.  In the middle of the 20th century, unsuccessful attempts were made to develop silkworm farming. Many tourists come for sports fishing and scuba diving. Its white sandy beaches make it an excellent place to swim in summer, since it receives considerably fewer visitors than the other islands in the Izu chain. There are many hiking courses around its volcano, Tenjō-san, which dominates the center of the island. However, winter visits are discouraged, cancellation of flights and ferries due to inclement weather can strand visitors. The island is also noted for its local Shōchū.

Transportation
Kōzushima is accessible by ferry from mainland Tokyo, Shimoda, Shizuoka, or other Izu Islands.
There are also daily flights from Chōfu Airport, in western Tokyo to Kozushima Airport.

Education
The village operates one public elementary and one public middle school.
 Kozushima Junior High School (神津島村立神津中学校)
 Kozushima Elementary School (神津島村立神津小学校)

Tokyo Metropolitan Government Board of Education operates  , the only high school in the village.

Gallery

See also

Izu Islands

References

External links

Kōzushima Village Official Website 

Villages of Tokyo
Populated coastal places in Japan
Izu Islands